Tantari is a rural locality (a selo) in Igalinsky Selsoviet, Gumbetovsky District, Republic of Dagestan, Russia. The population was 35000 as of 2010. There are 3 streets.

Geography 
Tantari is located 22 km southeast of Mekhelta (the district's administrative centre) by road, on the right bank of the Andiyskoye Koysu River. Kunzakh and Novoye Argvani are the nearest rural localities.

References 

Rural localities in Gumbetovsky District